Amalda utopica is a species of sea snail, a marine gastropod mollusc in the family Ancillariidae.

References

utopica
Gastropods described in 1987